Huesca is a city in north-eastern Spain, within the autonomous community of Aragon. It is also the capital of the Spanish province of the same name and of the comarca of Hoya de Huesca. In 2009 it had a population of 52,059, almost a quarter of the total population of the province. The city is one of the smallest provincial capitals in Spain.

Huesca celebrates its main festival, the Fiestas de San Lorenzo, in honor of Saint Lawrence, from the 9th to the 15th of August.

History

Huesca dates from pre-Roman times, and was once known as Bolskan in the ancient Iberian language. It was once the capital of the Vescetani, in the north of Hispania Tarraconensis, on the road from Tarraco (modern Tarragona) and Ilerda (modern Lleida) to Caesaraugusta (modern Zaragoza). During Roman times, the city was known as Osca, and was a Roman colony under the rule of Quintus Sertorius, who made Osca his base. The city minted its own coinage and was the site of a prestigious school founded by Sertorius to educate young Iberians in Latin and Roman customs. After Sertorius, it is thought that it was renamed Ileoscan by Strabo. It appears to have been situated on silver mines.

Eighteenth-century Spanish historian Enrique Flórez has pointed out the impossibility of one city supplying such vast quantities of minted silver as has been recorded by ancient writers under the terms argentum Oscense, signatum Oscense; and is of the opinion that "Oscense" meant "Spanish", being a corruption of "Eus-cara".  The Romanised city was made a municipium by decree of Augustus in 30 BC.

The Arabs conquered the city in the late 8th century, and the city came to be called Washqah (وشقة in Arabic), falling within the Upper March of the Emirate of Córdoba. It was ruled by a local governor appointed from Córdoba, but was repeatedly subject to political turmoil, rebellion and assassination as the Banu Qasi, Banu Amrus and Banu al-Tawil clans, as well as the Arista dynasty of Pamplona, struggled for control, autonomy and independence from the Emirate. In the mid-10th century, Wasqah was transferred to the Banu Tujib, who governed the Upper March from Zaragoza, and it became part of the Taifa of Zaragoza in 1018 when they successfully freed themselves from the disintegrating Caliphate. In 1094 Sancho Ramirez built the nearby Castle of Montearagón with the intention of laying siege to Wasqah but was killed by a stray arrow as he reached the city's walls. It was conquered in 1096 by Peter I of Aragon.

The school expanded, but by the end of the 16th century was eclipsed by the University of Zaragoza. The university was abolished in 1845.

During the Spanish Civil War (1936–39) the "Huesca Front" was the scene of some of the worst fighting between the Republicans and Franco's army. Held by the Nationalists, the city was besieged by the Republicans, with George Orwell among them, but did not fall.

Modern Huesca

Huesca celebrates its most important annual festival in August: the festival (or fiesta) of San Lorenzo (Saint Lawrence), a native of Huesca martyred in 268 AD. The anniversary of his martyrdom falls on August 10. The fiesta starts on 9 August and finishes on the 15. Many of the inhabitants dress in green and white for the duration.

San Lorenzo, born in Huesca, was a deacon in Rome and a martyr who, according to legend, was burned on a grille by the Romans. The grille is the symbol of San Lorenzo and can be seen in a number of decorative works in the city.

Huesca is also the birthplace of film director Carlos Saura and his brother Antonio Saura, a contemporary artist. There is an international film festival held annually.

The writer Oscar Sipan, winner of several literary prizes, was born in Huesca in 1974. The celebrated illustrator Isidro Ferrer, though born in Madrid, lives in the city.

Various streets in the centre of Huesca have recently been pedestrianised.

Geography
Close to the city lie the Sierra de Guara mountains, which reach 2,077 m. The geographical coordinates of the city are: 42° 08´ N, 0° 24´ W.

Its municipal area is 161.02 km ² and borders the municipalities of Almudévar, Vicién, Monflorite-Lascasas Tierz, Quicena, Loporzano, Nueno, Igriés, Banastás, Chimillas, Alerre, Barbués and Albero Bajo.

Coat of arms
Both the modern Coat of Arms of Huesca (es) (which date from the 16th century) and its mediaeval predecessor (from the 13th) include at their top the device of a block having a V-shaped notch. Some writers have suggested that the official Spanish name of Huesca derives from a Latin, Basque and Catalan word osca, meaning notch or indentation, referring to the Salto de Roldán.

Climate
Huesca has a humid subtropical climate (Köppen Cfa). with semi-arid influences. The average precipitation is 480 mm per year. Frost is common and there is sporadic snowfall, with an average of 3 snowy days per year.

Main sights
 

A double line of ancient walls can still be seen in present-day Huesca.

Nearby, in the territory of Quicena, lie the ruins of the Castle of Montearagón Monastery.

Churches of Huesca
 Huesca Cathedral (Catedral de la Transfiguración del Señor), a Gothic-style cathedral built by king James I of Aragon around 1273 on the ruined foundations of a mosque. Work continued until the fifteenth century, and the cathedral is now one of the architectural gems of northern Spain. The doorway, built between 1300 and 1313, has carvings depicting the Apostles. The interior contains a triple nave and chapels. It includes a magnificent high altar made from alabaster, carved to represent the crucifixion, built between 1520 and 1533 by Damián Forment. The cloister and the bell-tower were built in the fifteenth century.
Abbey of San Pedro el Viejo, erected between 1100 and 1241, is one of the oldest Romanesque structures in the Iberian Peninsula. It was partially rebuilt in the seventeenth century, and retains its cloister built in 1140.
Church of St. Lawrence (Iglesia de San Lorenzo), built in the seventeenth and eighteenth centuries.

Iglesia de Santo Domingo, a Baroque style church. 
Iglesia de la Compañía San Vicente, from the 17th century
Ermita de Ntr. Sra. de Salas, a Romanesque and Baroque hermitage.
Ermita de Loreto, San Lorenzo's oldest hermitage, according to tradition.
Ermita de San Jorge, built in memory of the Battle of Alcoraz
Ermita de las Mártires
Ermita de Santa Lucía
Ermita de Jara, in ruins
San Miguel, a Romanesque tower
Santa María de Foris, built in a transitional Romanesque style
Santa Cruz, Seminary, on Romanesque foundations.
There are several old monasteries in the local area. One in the Castle of Montearagón contains the tomb of king Alfonso I of Aragon in its crypt.
The Museum of Huesca occupies the building formerly belonging to the old university. The famous "Bell of Huesca" lies in one of its vaults, and is said to have been constructed from the heads of rebels who were executed by King Ramiro II of Aragon.

Notable people 
Amrus ibn Yusuf (Huesca, 760- 808/9 or 813/4 Talavera de la Reina or Zaragoza), general of the Emirate of Córdoba and governor of Zaragoza
Petrus Alphonsi (Born at an unknown date in the 11th century in Huesca, died 1140?), was a Jewish Spanish physician, writer, astronomer, and polemicist, who converted to Christianity.
Petronilla of Aragon (Huesca, 1136 – 15 October 1173), Queen of Aragon from the abdication of her father in 1137 until her own abdication in 1164.
Alfonso II of Aragon (Huesca, March 1157 – 25 April 1196), was the King of Aragon and Count of Barcelona from 1164 until his death.
Peter II of Aragon (Huesca, July 1178 – 12 September 1213), was the King of Aragon (as Pedro II) and Count of Barcelona (as Pere I) from 1196 to 1213.
Vincencio Juan de Lastanosa (Huesca, 1607 - 1681), collector, scholar, Spanish cultural promoter and patron.
Valentín Carderera (Huesca, 1796 - Madrid, 1880), promoter of the arts, writer and academic art painter.
Lucas Mallada y Pueyo (Huesca, 1841 - Madrid 1921), mining engineer, paleontologist and writer, belonging to Regenerationism movement.
Fidel Pagés (Huesca, January 26, 1886 - September 21, 1923 Madrid), Spanish military surgeon, known for developing the technique of epidural anesthesia.
Ramón Acín Aquilué (1888, Huesca, Aragon, Spain – 1936), anarcho-syndicalist, teacher, writer and avant-garde artist murdered by fascists in the first year of the Spanish Civil War.
Pepín Bello (13 May 1904, Huesca – 11 January 2008), intellectual and writer. He was regarded as the last survivor of the "Generation of '27".
Julio Alejandro (Huesca, 1906 – 1995 Javea), was a Spanish screenwriter. He wrote for 80 films between 1951 and 1984.
Antonio Saura (September 22, 1930, Huesca – July 22, 1998, Cuenca) was a Spanish artist and writer, one of the major post-war painters to emerge in Spain in the fifties.
Carlos Saura (born 4 January 1932, Huesca) is a Spanish film director and photographer.
Josep Acebillo (born in Huesca, Spain, in 1946), architect.
Esteban Navarro (Moratalla, 1965), writer. Huesca resident since 2001.
Nunilo and Alodia (Huesca, A.D. 851), martyrs of Christianity. Died after refusing to deny Christ.

Popular references
 
Huesca is notable for the saying "Tomorrow we'll have coffee in Huesca", a running joke among militiamen of the Spanish Civil War. In February 1937, George Orwell was stationed near the falangist-held Huesca as a member of the POUM militia. In Homage to Catalonia, Orwell writes about this running joke, originally a naïvely optimistic comment made by one of the Spanish Republican generals:

Huesca is also famous for the legend of the Bell of Huesca.

Twin towns - sister cities

The following are Sister cities of Huesca:
  Tarbes, France (since 1964)

Transportation
The Autovía A-23 runs through Huesca, connecting the city with Zaragoza. While under construction as of 2018, the Autovía A-22 also connects Huesca to Lleida. The two highways will eventually connect.

Huesca has been served by Huesca–Pirineos Airport since 1930, but the airport does not currently have any scheduled commercial passenger services.

Huesca railway station is served by regional and AVE trains to destinations including Zaragoza, Canfranc, Madrid and Jaca.

Sports
In 2018, SD Huesca, became the town's first football team to be promoted to La Liga. They became the 63rd team to play in the league, and their stadium's maximum capacity was the smallest in the 2018–19 La Liga.

See also

 Diocese of Huesca

Notes

References

Further reading
Michael H. Crawford, 1985. Coinage and Money Under the Roman Republic in series Library of Numismatics  (London: Methuen and Co. Ltd.), pages 84 – 102.

External links

Council of Huesca 
Huesca Film Festival
CDAN, Centre of Art and Nature
Diario Del Alto Aragón 
Virtual Tour around Huesca
Excursiones por Huesca 
Fiestas de San Lorenzo  
Postal codes in Huesca

 
Municipalities in the Province of Huesca
Roman sites in Spain